Digambar or Digambara may refer to:

People
Digambar Kamat (1954), Indian politician
Digambar Behera (1953), Indian physician
Digambar Mitra (1817–1879), Sheriff of Kolkata
Digambara Patra, Professor of Chemistry
Digambara monk, Sādhu in Digambar tradition

Organization
Digambar Jain Mahasabha, Lay Jains organization

Place
Digambarpur, town in Chhireswornath
Digambara, schools of Jainism

Temple
Digambara Jain temple, Khandagiri
Digambara Jain Temple, Rourkela